The Federated States of Micronesia Athletic Association (FSMAA) is the governing body for the sport of athletics in the Federated States of Micronesia (FSM).

History
Athletes from Yap, Truk (now Chuuk), Ponape (now Pohnpei) and Kusaie (now Kosrae), but then part of the Ponape District (then still being part of the Trust Territory of the Pacific Islands), participated already in three separate teams at the 1969 Micronesian Games, at the 1975 South Pacific Games as part of a combined Micronesia team, and also after re-establishment of the Micronesian Games in 1990, in four separate teams.  

It is reported, that a FSM Athletics Federation was already formed many years ago, but the official foundation of FSMAA occurred only in 1996, and its affiliation to the IAAF in the year 1997.

Julio Akapito from Chuuk formerly served as president of FSMAA.

Current president is Ted Rutun from Yap.

Affiliations 
International Association of Athletics Federations (IAAF)
Oceania Athletics Association (OAA)
Moreover, it is part of the following national organizations:
Federated States of Micronesia National Olympic Committee (FSMNOC)

Members 
FSMAA (most probably) comprises the associations of the four member states of Micronesia.

National records 
FSMAA maintains the Micronesian records in athletics.

External links
Official Webpage

References 

Micronesia
Sports in the Federated States of Micronesia
Athletics in the Federated States of Micronesia
National governing bodies for athletics
Sports organizations established in 1996
1996 establishments in the Federated States of Micronesia